The Linhai Industrial Park is an industrial park located in Siaogang District and Cianjhen District of Kaohsiung, Taiwan. It near the Kaohsiung International Airport, No. 5 Container Center of Port of Kaohsiung and the terminal of National Highway No. 1. The Talin Power Plant, a fossil fuel power plant, is located near the park. And a reservoir called Fengshan Reservoir is to the south of park.

Linhai Industrial Park is a major cluster of heavy industry in Taiwan. There are several of the largest producers in their industries situated in this industrial park, such as China Steel (steelmaker), CSBC Corporation (ship builder) and CPC Corporation (oil refiner). Furthermore, Linhai Industrial Park also has some manufacturers of machinery, steel, transportation and chemical industry.

History
The industrial park was originally established in 1960 and completed in January 1972.

Transportation
The area is accessible within walking distance south of Siaogang Station of Kaohsiung MRT.

See also
 Economy of Taiwan

References

External links
 Official website

Industrial parks in Taiwan
Buildings and structures in Kaohsiung
1972 establishments in Taiwan